MidAtlantic Airways was a regional airline based at Pittsburgh International Airport in Findlay Township, Pennsylvania, USA. It was a subsidiary of US Airways and operated the Embraer 170 medium-jet aircraft as a US Airways Express carrier. It ceased operations on May 27, 2006.

History 

The airline was reformed from the remnants of short-lived Potomac Air, which was created in late 2000 and started flying 37-seat de Havilland Canada Dash 8-200 aircraft in early 2001, based at Ronald Reagan National Airport in Arlington County, Virginia near Washington D.C. Potomac ceased operations during the closure of Reagan National after the September 11 terrorist attacks; US Airways then reformed Potomac as MidAtlantic in the spring of 2002. MidAtlantic officially launched on Sunday, April 4, 2004 with service from Pittsburgh.

Some CRJ flying was done by MidAtlantic as early as 2002 but those airplanes eventually went the US Airways Group subsidiary PSA Airlines.

On February 9, 2006, US Airways announced a firm order for 25 Embraer 190 aircraft, a cousin of the 170. However, unlike the smaller E-Jet, the 190 has an 11-seat First Class cabin and is operated by mainline employees under the US Airways banner. On May 28, 2006, MidAtlantic stopped operating.

Destinations 
As of January 2006, MidAtlantic Airways was operating services to the following domestic scheduled destinations: Albany, Atlanta, Baltimore, Boston, Burlington,  Charleston, Chicago, Cleveland, Dallas/Fort Worth, Detroit, Fort Lauderdale,   Hartford, Houston, Jacksonville, Kansas City, 
Key West, Manchester, Milwaukee, Nashville, New York, Orlando, Philadelphia, Pittsburgh, Portland, Providence, Raleigh/Durham, Rochester, St Louis and Washington.

Fleet 
As of January 2005, the MidAtlantic Airways fleet consisted of:

 25 Embraer 170
 6 Bombardier CRJ700
 On order: 60 Embraer 170

See also 
 List of defunct airlines of the United States

Notes

References

 Press release, US Airways, May 30, 2002, "US AIRWAYS FORMS MIDATLANTIC AIRWAYS TO PREPARE FOR PLANNED REGIONAL JET GROWTH"
 "US Airways regional jet unit closes for good," Dan Fitzpatrick, Pittsburgh Post-Gazette, March 31, 2006

2002 establishments in Pennsylvania
2006 disestablishments in Pennsylvania
Airlines established in 2002
Airlines disestablished in 2006
Defunct airlines of the United States
Defunct companies based in Pennsylvania
US Airways Group